Javier Soñer (born 19 March 1995) is an Argentine footballer who plays as a centre forward for Olimpo.

References

External links
 

1995 births
Living people
Argentine footballers
Association football forwards
All Boys footballers
People from Curuzú Cuatiá
Sportspeople from Corrientes Province